The 2020 NCAA Division I women's soccer tournament (also known as the 2020 Women's College Cup) was the 39th annual single-elimination tournament to determine the national champion of NCAA Division I women's collegiate soccer.  The Santa Clara Broncos defeated the Florida State Seminoles on penalty kicks to win the national championship.

Effects of the Covid 19 pandemic 
As a result of the COVID-19 pandemic, the NCAA postponed the fall championships, hoping to play them in the spring.  In September, a plan was approved to hold fall championships in the spring.

Instead of the usual 64-team tournament, the field is reduced to 48 teams for the 2020 tournament.

Rather than the higher seed hosting the early-round matches, the entire tournament will be played in the state of North Carolina, similar to how the 2021 men's and women's basketball tournaments were held in a single state.

Venues

Qualified teams 
48 teams qualified for the Division I women's soccer tournament. There were 29 conference champions after the Big West Conference and Ivy League chose not to have a 2020 fall or 2021 spring season. The other 19 were at-large selections.

Bracket

Results

First Round

Second Round

Third Round

Quarterfinals

Semifinals

Final 

Rankings shown are tournament seeds

Record by conference 

The R32, S16, E8, F4, CG, and NC columns indicate how many teams from each conference were in the Round of 32 (second round), Round of 16 (third round), Quarterfinals, Semi-finals, Final, and National Champion, respectively.

Statistics

Goalscorers

References 

NCAA Division I
Women's soccer in the United States
NCAA 2020
2020
NCAA Division I Women's Soccer Tournament
NCAA Division I Women's Soccer Tournament
NCAA Division I Women's Soccer Tournament